"Atlas, Rise!" is a song by heavy metal band Metallica, and the third single from their tenth studio album, Hardwired... to Self-Destruct. It was released on October 31, 2016. The song was nominated for Best Rock Song at the 60th Annual Grammy Awards.

Promotion
"Atlas, Rise!" was released on October 31, 2016, and received a Halloween-themed promotion. The single's release was promoted with a limited-edition free Hardwired Halloween mask at participating record stores that contained a special download code to be able to access the track 30 minutes earlier than the full public release. It was performed live for the first time in Bogotá, Colombia, on November 1, 2016.

Personnel
 James Hetfield – vocals, rhythm guitar
 Kirk Hammett – lead guitar
 Robert Trujillo – bass
 Lars Ulrich – drums

Charts

Weekly charts

Year-end charts

References

2016 singles
Metallica songs
2016 songs
Songs written by Lars Ulrich
Songs written by James Hetfield

Progressive metal songs